The Continental Mark VII, later changed to Lincoln Mark VII, is a rear wheel drive luxury coupe that was produced by Lincoln. Introduced in August 1983 for the 1984 model year, the Continental Mark VII shared its Ford Fox platform with the Ford Thunderbird, Mercury Cougar, and Lincoln Continental.  The Fox platform was originally introduced for the 1978 Ford Fairmont and Mercury Zephyr.  The same platform was also utilized as the base for the 1982–1987 Lincoln Continental sedan, the Mark VII's four-door companion.  Like its predecessor the Continental Mark VI, the Mark VII was manufactured at the Wixom Assembly Plant in Wixom, Michigan through 1992. It was replaced by the Lincoln Mark VIII in 1993.

The Mark VII held a lengthy standard equipment list, including an onboard trip computer / message center and digital instruments (on all except the LSC models after 1985).  Mark VII's also came with full air suspension at all four wheels. The 1985 LSC was the first American vehicle with electronic 4-channel anti-lock brakes (6 months before the Corvette).  Mark VII also had the distinction of being the first American vehicle since 1939 with composite headlights and it was the first of the Continental Mark models to have exposed headlights since the 1960 Continental Mark V.

Continental Mark VII (1984–1985)
The Continental Mark VII was introduced in August 1983 for the 1984 model year.  It was available in a base trim level, Designer Edition (Bill Blass Edition and Versace Edition). A new sport-oriented upper trim level was introduced with this generation, called the LSC (Luxury Sports Coupe).  Alongside the standard 140 hp 5.0L V8 shared with the Ford Mustang is a 114 hp 2.4L turbocharged diesel inline-6 obtained from BMW to offer a more fuel efficient engine offering; all Mark VIIs came with a 4-speed automatic transmission.

To back its image as a technically advanced car for the 1980s, the Mark VII was equipped with a long list of standard equipment.  A fully digital dashboard featured an onboard trip computer and message center; automatic climate control was also standard.  Other standard features included four-wheel air suspension, four-wheel disc brakes, power seats, an AM/FM stereo, and power windows, locks, and mirrors.  All Mark VIIs featured a power deck-lid release (through an interior mounted button) and electric pull-down, in which the trunk lid was partially lowered by hand, and then automatically pulled down about an inch by a motor mounted inside the trunk latch.  All models were now installed with Ford's Keyless Entry System, and an automatic dimming high-beam module.  This worked via a sensor located adjacent to the rear-view mirror, and sensitivity could be adjusted by a dial located on the dashboard.

The Mark VII was the first modern American manufactured vehicle to be equipped with a replaceable bulb headlamp system. The dealer-installed GTC performance option package is introduced (see below). As they have largely been replaced by cassette tapes, the 8-track tape player option is discontinued. An in-car telephone is added to the options list for $2,995 ($ in  dollars ).

Lincoln Mark VII (1986–1992)

For 1986, the Mark series was integrated into the Lincoln brand after being within the Continental marque for 18 years, ending the naming confusion. The Continental Mark VII was renamed the Lincoln Mark VII and given Lincoln badges with the first three digits of the VIN changed from 1MR Continental to 1LN Lincoln. Other visual changes involved the addition of a federally mandated center brake light (CHMSL).  The rarely-seen BMW diesel was dropped from the line, as was the Versace Edition. A number of changes were made for the LSC for 1986 to differentiate it from the rest of the Mark VII line.  To update its performance image, the 1986 LSC was given analog gauges in place of the all-digital dash; the engine output increased to 200 hp. Largely unchanged from 1986, a running change late in 1987 production added the 225 hp 5.0L "H.O." to a limited number of LSC models.  1987 would be the last year the Mark VII offered an optional CB radio.  Since vent windows had all but disappeared on American automobiles by the 1980s, the option for them was discontinued for 1987.

For 1988, the Mark VII model line was revised.  As the Mark VII carried a large list of features, the base-trim model was discontinued, leaving the luxury-oriented Bill Blass Edition and the performance-oriented LSC; both versions were priced the same.  The 150 hp and 200 hp versions of the 5.0L V8 were replaced by the 225 hp "H.O." version; shared with the Mustang GT, it was sold in both Bill Blass and LSC Mark VIIs.  On LSC models, wheel size was increased to 16 inches. For 1989, relatively few changes were made to the Mark VII. To improve the handling of LSC models, Lincoln made changes to the steering. The 1989 model was the last year with a hood ornament.

For 1990, to accommodate passive-restraint regulations, the Mark VII was given a driver-side airbag and three-point seatbelts were added to the outboard rear seats.  Since it had not been updated since 1984, the dashboard and interior controls were given a redesign; LSC models saw the addition of a 120 mph speedometer.  LSC models were given 16-inch wheels with a design that was essentially a clone of the BBS RA wheel. To give new life to the Mark VII, the monochromatic LSC SE (Special Edition) was introduced.
For 1991, the Mark VII line is consolidated mechanically, as the Bill Blass Edition adopts the suspension and wheels of the LSC; the Bill Blass Edition is largely differentiated by its use of a digital dashboard.  Both versions are given redesigned seats (distinguished by lower headrests). For 1992, the Mark VII saw no major changes from 1991.  A new color, Deep Jewel Green Metallic Clearcoat, was introduced and is very rare. A total of 190,832 Mark VIIs were produced.

Variants

Aftermarket 
The Mark VII GTC was a Lincoln-Mercury dealer-sold car built by Cars & Concepts with monochromatic paint, a body kit, and available performance upgrades. A select few were sent to Jack Roush Performance for suspension enhancements and optional 5.8L and T5 manual transmission conversions. There was also a 'Comtech' Mark VII, with a CRT touch screen, which did exist in at least one vehicle, it was on loan to Bob Bondurant while he had his driving school at Sears Point Raceway. Ford Motor Company allowed him to have a fleet of new vehicles every year, and one of Bob's choices was the Comtech Mark VII.  Larry Albedi Motors (Lincoln-Mercury) in Vallejo, California, serviced the vehicle a couple of times before it was returned to Ford at the end of the year. The Comtech parts that were unique to that Mark VII were also listed in the Lincoln Mercury parts catalog, but when the Merkur arrived the Comtech pages were removed and the Merkur pages replaced them. The Comtech model being a prototype, they saw no reason to keep it in the parts catalog.

Powertrain
The engine choices were a 5.0 L V8 and rare (approximately 2,300 made) 2.4 L I6 diesel. The diesel was a BMW design with a turbocharger and only available in 1984 and 1985. At least one diesel Mark VII was reportedly equipped with a 5-speed manual transmission.

Production

Racing
The Mark VII was raced in the Trans-Am Series in 1984 and 1985 without much success, with the best result being a ninth-place finish.

Awards
The Mark VII LSC was on Car and Driver magazine's Ten Best list for 1986.

References

External links

 Lincoln Mark VII Club

Mark 7
Coupés
Rear-wheel-drive vehicles
1990s cars
Personal luxury cars
Cars introduced in 1983
Cars discontinued in 1992